Baillie Walsh is a film director and screenwriter.

Career
Walsh made his feature-film debut with Flashbacks of a Fool, starring Daniel Craig and Felicity Jones, which he wrote and directed. He has also directed the documentaries Mirror Mirror, Lord Don't Slow Me Down, Springsteen & I, and Being James Bond, a documentary about Daniel Craig's tenure in the role.

Walsh has also created films and advertisements for many corporate brands including for Levis, Sony, Huawei, Citroën, Versace, Hugo Boss, Cartier, YSL, and Thierry Mugler, and has worked with actors such as Eva Mendes, Ryan Reynolds, Scarlett Johansson, and Anne Hathaway. 
He has also directed many videos for music artists such as Oasis, Kylie Minogue, New Order, INXS, and Spiritualized.

Other notable works include the hologram installation of Kate Moss for the designer Alexander McQueen, Massive Attack’s seminal ‘Unfinished Sympathy’ video, and the 2018 charity video Malaria Must Die So Millions Can Live. Walsh also directed ABBA Voyage Arena—an ABBA concert not featuring the live band, but using technology to bring the band to life.

Filmography
 1996: Mirror, Mirror
 2001: Massive Attack: Eleven Promos
 2004: I'm Only Looking: The Best of INXS
 2007: Lord Don't Slow Me Down
 2008: Flashbacks of a Fool
 2013: Springsteen & I
 2021: Being James Bond

References

External links
 
 Baillie Walsh’ Curators Choice of inspirational music videos

British film directors
Living people
1953 births